Nicholas John Cester (born 6 July 1979) is an Australian musician, singer, songwriter and guitarist, known for being the frontman and lead singer in rock band Jet alongside his younger brother Chris. Cester is also a founder of the Australian supergroup The Wrights. Jet's track "Are You Gonna Be My Girl", has won APRA Awards for 'Most Performed Australian Work Overseas' in 2006 and 2007.

Biography
Nicholas John Cester was born on 6 July 1979 and grew up in Melbourne. He is the oldest of four brothers, born to a Scottish mother and an Australian father of Italian descent, John. His paternal grandparents immigrated from the provinces of Treviso and Pordenone. His uncle, Eugene Cester (aka Eugene De La Hot Croix Bun), is a founder of satirical rock band TISM. Cester attended St Bedes Boys College in Mentone, Victoria, and sees The Beatles as his greatest musical influence.

Cester and Cameron Muncey formed a band in 1996 during secondary school. Cester decided to learn how to play guitar after watching his uncle play "Blackbird". Jet has a line-up of Cester (vocals, guitar), his brother Chris (drums, percussion, vocals), Muncey (lead guitar, vocals), and Mark Wilson (bass, piano, vocals). When Jet first began performing in clubs, Cester was working in a local factory as a forklift operator. Jet played multiple shows and residencies at The Duke of Windsor Hotel in Chapel Street, Windsor. Dave Powell of Majorbox Music saw them play one night and decided to manage the group. The band was signed to the Elektra record label after their debut single, "Take It Or Leave It", became a hit.

Cester is also a founder of the supergroup The Wrights. On 31 October 2007, Cester performed alongside Powderfinger and Missy Higgins in Concert for a Cure (for women with breast cancer). In February 2009, Cester performed at the 50th anniversary celebration of the founding of Melbourne's Myer Music Bowl with a cover version of Paul McCartney's "Maybe I'm Amazed". On 22 January 2010, he covered the AC/DC song "Back in Black" with British rock group Muse at the Big Day Out. On 8 June he sang it with Muse again at San Siro gig, in Milan.

Cester, with Davey Lane and Kram have provided a single, "Tomorrow", for the Australian feature film Tomorrow, When the War Began. Cester appears in Kram's "Silk Suits" music video as a tennis umpire alongside Australian Tennis Player Alicia Molik.

In November 2017 he released his first solo album Sugar Rush.

Since 2017, he is one of the lead vocalists of The Jaded Hearts Club. In 2020, he released two singles with them and on 2 October 2020, they released their album, You've Always Been Here.

Personal life
He speaks fluent Italian. Cester tours with Jet for most of the year, but when not travelling he shares his time between homes in Melbourne and Como, Italy. In August 2004, his father, John, died of cancer. Cester wrote the song "Shine On" for his younger brothers and cousins as a tribute. In late October 2006, Cester was diagnosed with vocal nodules. Jet rescheduled several European dates, allowing him time to recover. He married longtime girlfriend, Pia McGeoch. They welcomed a girl in early 2018. He also has a lot of family in Scotland, through his mother, whose cousin, Anne-Marie Kirkwood lives in Scotland and had a part to play in his childhood.

Instruments and equipment

Electric guitars
 Gibson ES-335
 Gibson SG
 Gretsch Duo-Jet.

Acoustic guitars
 Gibson SJ-200 Modern Classic
Cole Clark FL-3

Amplifiers/Heads
 Hiwatt Amp Head
 Hiwatt Quad Box
 Marshall Quad Box
 Orange Amp Head
 Vox AC30 Heritage Head
 Vox V212 Heritage Cabinet

APRA Awards
The APRA Awards are presented annually from 1982 by the Australasian Performing Right Association (APRA).

|-
|rowspan="3"| 2006 || "Are You Gonna Be My Girl" – Nicholas Cester, Cameron Muncey || Most Performed Australian Work Overseas || 
|-
| "Cold Hard Bitch" – Nicholas Cester, Christopher Cester, Cameron Muncey || Most Performed Australian Work Overseas || 
|-
| "Look What You've Done" - Nicholas Cester || Most Performed Australian Work Overseas || 
|-
|rowspan="2"| 2007 || "Are You Gonna Be My Girl" – Nicholas Cester, Cameron Muncey || Most Performed Australian Work Overseas || 
|-
| "Look What You've Done" – Nicholas Cester || Most Performed Australian Work Overseas ||

Charitable work 
Cester is a supporter of The Fred Hollows Foundation, founded by eye surgeon Fred Hollows. In 2008, Cester's band Jet released a video clip paying tribute to Hollows.

References

General
 
  Note: [on-line] version established at White Room Electronic Publishing Pty Ltd in 2007 and was expanded from the 2002 edition.

Specific

External links
Nic Cester official site
  JET official site
JET official MySpace site

1979 births
Living people
APRA Award winners
Australian people of Scottish descent
Australian rock guitarists
Australian rock singers
Australian singers of Italian descent
Jet (band) members
Musicians from Melbourne
Rhythm guitarists
The Wrights (Australian band) members
21st-century Australian singers
21st-century guitarists
21st-century Australian male singers
Australian male guitarists
People from Dingley Village, Victoria